Preston Brook is a village and civil parish in the borough of Halton, a unitary authority in the ceremonial county of Cheshire in North West England. It is located to the south-east of Runcorn and south-west of Warrington, adjacent to the M56 motorway. The parish includes the village of Preston on the Hill.

At the 2011 Census, the parish had a population of 809, up from 716 in 2001. Approximately 3,000 people are employed in the area. Preston Brook has a small industrial park called Abbot's Park, formerly used by the mobile telephone company O2 and Wincanton Logistics, though it is now used by Capita, Marks & Spencer, O2, First Group and Tesco Mobile.

The Bridgewater Canal runs from Manchester through Preston Brook where it divides into two branches.  One branch leads to Runcorn where it used to join the Manchester Ship Canal, and before that the River Mersey, while the other branch joins the Trent and Mersey Canal at the Preston Brook canal tunnel.

The community has a website and a bi-monthly newsletter.

See also
Listed buildings in Preston Brook

References

Villages in Cheshire
Civil parishes in Cheshire
Borough of Halton
Trent and Mersey Canal